The Aberdeen Suburban Tramways operated two electric tramway services in Aberdeen between 1904 and 1927.

History

The Aberdeen Suburban Tramways operated two separate tramway services in Aberdeen, which were essentially extensions from the terminus of Aberdeen Corporation Tramways routes. 

The first was from the Great Western Road terminus to Bieldside church. The second was from the Great Northern Road terminus to Stoneywood church.

The company had a fleet of 11 trams for these two services, from Brush Electrical Engineering Company and United Electric Car Company.

Depots were at the junction of Fountainhall Road and Queen's Lane North (grid reference ), and on St Peter Street (grid reference ).

Closure

The services stopped running on 2 June 1927, a year after the corporation had terminated the through running arrangements.

Remaining infrastructure

Part of the tracks still remain behind the takeaway at the bottom of Bankhead Avenue.
And on the Bankhead Church opposite,  is a tram rosette, used to hold up overhead in places where there were not poles.
This tram rosette is in fact the most northerly in the United Kingdom.

References

External links
 Aberdeen Suburban Tramways Company at British Tramway Company Badges and Buttons

Tram transport in Scotland